Arlington is an unincorporated community in Posey Township, in the northwestern part of Rush County, Indiana, United States. It lies just south of the B&O Railroad, on U.S. Route 52, 8 miles west of Rushville.

History
Arlington was originally called Burlington, and under the latter name was laid out in 1832. The present name is after Arlington, Virginia.

The Arlington post office has been in operation since 1875.

Geography

Demographics

References

Unincorporated communities in Rush County, Indiana
Unincorporated communities in Indiana